Fox and the Whale is a 2016 Canadian animated short film directed by Robin Joseph.

Plot 
The short film takes place over what appears to be three or four nights. It features a fox desperately searching across a seaside and through a lush forest for the whale. The viewers are able to hear crickets, woodpeckers, birds, waterfalls, water rushing through a creek, and a storm as the fox wanders throughout the forest. He goes fishing, sleeps in a cave, watches birds, star gazes, and dreams about meeting the whale. There are many creatures in the forest, butterflies, a rabbit, a frog, and many fish. But the fox seems to have his heart set on meeting the whale. When he finally finds the whale, all that is left is the skeleton. The fox touches the skeleton and appears to be saddened as he paddles his way home with his eyes closed.

Awards 
The film made the initial list of ten contenders for the Academy Award for Best Animated Short Film, but was not among the final five nominees. It was a Canadian Screen Award nominee for Best Animated Short Film at the 6th Canadian Screen Awards.

See also
2016 in film
Independent animation
Canadian animation

References

External links
 
 Fox and the Whale on Vimeo

2016 short films
2010s animated short films
Canadian animated short films
2016 animated films
2016 films
Animated films about foxes
2010s Canadian films